George Tony Lyons  (January 25, 1891 – August 12, 1981) was an American professional baseball pitcher who played a total of 33 games in Major League Baseball (MLB) for the 1920 St. Louis Cardinals and the 1924 St. Louis Browns.

Biography
Nicknamed "Smooth", Lyons played minor league baseball from 1914 to 1928, except for 1916 when there is no record of him playing professionally. Lyons played only six games during the 1918 season, due to military service from May 1918 to January 1919. In 13 minor league seasons, he accrued a 124–163 win–loss record for seasons that records are available for.

Lyons' first major league stint came in September 1920 with the St. Louis Cardinals. His best outing was a complete game 4–2 win over the Philadelphia Phillies on September 22. With the Cardinals, Lyons pitched in seven games (two starts) registering a 2–1 record with a 3.09 earned run average (ERA) while striking out five batters in  innings pitched.

Lyons returned to the major leagues in 1924 with the St. Louis Browns, when he pitched in 26 games (six starts). He had two complete game wins in June; one an 11–4 win over the Boston Red Sox, the other a 10–2 win over the Philadelphia Athletics. His record with the Browns was 3–2 with a 5.21 ERA and 25 strikeouts in  innings pitched.

Lyons' major league pitching appearances yielded an overall 5–3 record with a 4.72 ERA in 33 games pitched. As a batter, he accrued a .222 batting average (6-for-27) with four RBIs. Defensively, he committed no errors in 39 total chances for a 1.000 fielding average.

Born in Bible Grove, Illinois, in 1891, Lyons served in the United States Army during World War I. He died at age 90 in Nevada, Missouri, and was interred there. The ballpark in the city of Nevada—used by the local high school and a M.I.N.K. Collegiate Baseball League team—is named Lyons Stadium in his honor.

References

Further reading

External links

1891 births
1981 deaths
Baseball players from Illinois
St. Louis Cardinals players
St. Louis Browns players
Ottawa Indians players
Clinton Pilots players
Wichita Witches players
Wichita Jobbers players
Sioux City Packers players
Los Angeles Angels (minor league) players
Toledo Mud Hens players
Columbus Senators players
People from Clay County, Illinois
United States Army personnel of World War I